Värnhem is a neighbourhood of Malmö, situated in the Borough of Centrum, Malmö Municipality, Skåne County, Sweden. The neighbourhood gives its name to Värnhemstorget, however the square is actually located in the adjacent neighbourhood Rörsjöstaden.

References

Neighbourhoods of Malmö